The discography of American rock band Hoobastank consists of six studio albums, one live album, three compilation albums, three video albums, one extended play and 20 singles. An unofficial live album, the bootleg Live at Circo Voador, is in circulation among fans.

Albums

Studio albums

Independent albums

Live albums

Compilation albums

Video albums

Extended plays

Singles

Soundtracks

Music videos

Notes

A  "Disappear" did not enter the Billboard Hot 100, but peaked at number 1 on the Bubbling Under Hot 100 Singles chart, which acts as a 25-song extension to the Hot 100.
B  "If I Were You" did not enter the Billboard Hot 100, peaked at number 17 on the Bubbling Under Hot 100 Singles chart, which acts as a 25-song extension to the Hot 100.

References

Discographies of American artists
Rock music group discographies